Rik Kuypers (11 April 1925 – 21 May 2019) was a Belgian film director. He directed 29 films between 1947 and 1981. He co-directed the film Seagulls Die in the Harbour, which was entered into the 1956 Cannes Film Festival.

Selected filmography
 Seagulls Die in the Harbour (1955)

References

External links

1925 births
2019 deaths
Belgian film directors
People from Mortsel